Paul Marie Kinam Roh (22 January 1902 – 25 June 1984) was Apostolic Vicar of Seoul in 1940–1962 and then Archbishop for the Roman Catholic Archdiocese of Seoul in 1962–1967. He was noted as Pro-American and Anti-Communist in the Syngman Rhee years.

References 

Roman Catholic archbishops of Seoul
South Korean Roman Catholic archbishops
1902 births
1984 deaths
20th-century Roman Catholic archbishops in South Korea
Jangyeon No clan
Roman Catholic bishops of Pyongyang
Roman Catholic bishops of Seoul